A rolling ball sculpture (sometimes referred to as a marble run, ball run, gravitram, kugelbahn (German: 'ball track'), or rolling ball machine) is a form of kinetic art – an art form that contains moving pieces – that specifically involves one or more rolling balls.

A version where marbles compete in a race to win is called a marble race.

Toys
People make toys out of Rolling ball sculptures.

World records

See also
George Rhoads
David Morrell (sculptor)
 Matthew Gaulden
Rube Goldberg machine
Bruce Gray (sculptor)
Perplexus
Rolling ball clock

References

Modern art
Types of sculpture
Kinetic art